is a railway station in the town of Hiranai in Aomori Prefecture, Japan, operated by the third sector railway operator Aoimori Railway Company.

Lines
Karibasawa Station is served by the Aoimori Railway Line, and is 83.8 kilometers from the terminus of the line at Metoki Station.

Station layout
Karibasawa Station two opposed side platforms connected the station building by a footbridge. The small station building is unattended.

Platforms

History
Karibasawa Station was opened on January 4, 1894 as a station on the Nippon Railway. It became a station on the Tōhoku Main Line of the Japanese Government Railways (JGR), the pre-war predecessor to the Japan National Railways (JNR), after the nationalization of the Nippon Railway on November 1, 1906. Regularly scheduled freight services were discontinued in February 1962. With the privatization of the JNR on April 1, 1987, the station came under the operational control of East Japan Railway Company (JR East).

The section of the Tōhoku Main Line including this station was transferred to Aoimori Railway on December 4, 2010.

Surrounding area
 Noheji Port

See also
 List of Railway Stations in Japan

References
 JTB Timetable December 2010 issue

External links

 

Railway stations in Aomori Prefecture
Aoimori Railway Line
Hiranai, Aomori
Railway stations in Japan opened in 1894